Joseph Blumenthal (December 1, 1834 – March 2, 1901) was a Jewish German-American businessman, politician, and communal worker from New York.

Life 
Blumenthal was born on December 1, 1834, in Munich, the Kingdom of Bavaria, the son of Lawrence and Rebecca Blumenthal. He immigrated to America when he was 5.

In 1853, Blumenthal moved to Mariposa County, California, where he lived for the next five years. In 1858, he returned to New York City, where he worked as a merchant and importer. He was a member of the Committee of Seventy. He served as a director and president of the Caddo Asphalt Mining Company. As a young man, he was a member of the state militia, serving as a staff officer of the Third Cavalry Regiment of the New York National Guard.

In 1872, Blumenthal was elected to the New York State Assembly as a Democrat, representing the New York County 15th District. He served in the Assembly in 1873, 1874, 1888, 1889, 1890, and 1891. He served as head of the Bureau of Incumbrances for several years, and was the commissioner taxes and assessments from 1893 to 1895.

Blumenthal was active in Jewish communal affairs. He was a member, trustee, and president of Congregation Shearith Israel, a director and president of the Young Men's Hebrew Association,  and a founder and president of the Jewish Theological Seminary of America. He was also a member of B'nai B'rith and the Freemasons. He helped make the Hebrew Orphan Asylum of New York more prominent, was the first president of the Sanitary Aid Society, served as president and director of Mount Zion Cemetery, and helped in the founding of another of Jewish charities.

Blumenthal died in New York on March 2, 1901. He was buried in Beth Olam Cemetery.

References

External links 
 The Political Graveyard

1834 births
1901 deaths
People from the Kingdom of Bavaria
Politicians from Munich
Jewish German politicians
Bavarian emigrants to the United States
Jewish American state legislators in New York (state)
Politicians from Manhattan
19th-century American politicians
Democratic Party members of the New York State Assembly
Jewish Theological Seminary of America people
American Freemasons
Burials at Beth Olom Cemetery